Benedetto Gravina (born 5 September 1956) is an Italian boxer. He competed in the men's light middleweight event at the 1980 Summer Olympics. At the 1980 Summer Olympics, he lost to Ján Franek of Czechoslovakia.

References

1956 births
Living people
Italian male boxers
Olympic boxers of Italy
Boxers at the 1980 Summer Olympics
Sportspeople from Bari
Light-middleweight boxers